Zrazy (Polish: zrazy, Lithuanian: zrazai or mušti suktinukai)  is a meat roulade dish popular in Poland (Silesian rouladen), western Belarus and Lithuania. Its origin can be traced back to the times of the Polish–Lithuanian Commonwealth.

Ingredients
Classic zrazy have a rolled shape and are made of thin slices of beef, which is flavored with salt and pepper and stuffed with vegetables, mushrooms, eggs, and potato. However, there are numerous stuffing combinations as new ones are encouraged, such as pickles and bacon.

The stuffed meat is then rolled and secured with thread or toothpicks. After being fried in oil for a short period of time, the zrazy are placed in a casserole with celery, onion, and various spices and covered with a hot stock. The casserole is then stewed at a low temperature.

Prior to serving, the threads or toothpicks are removed; the zrazy is then drained and sometimes dusted with flour or topped with sour cream.

Zrazy are eaten with the sauce in which they were stewed and are usually garnished with crumbled kasha, usually buckwheat and barley.

In place of beef, zrazy can also be made with veal or pork.

History
It is unknown exactly when this dish was invented as well as which region of the former Polish–Lithuanian Commonwealth first produced it; both Poland and Lithuania claim to have created zrazy.

In its traditional shape, it probably comes from Lithuanian cuisine, although its name comes from Polish and means a slice of meat or roast cut off from the whole.

See also
Roulade – general French-origin word for rolled meat dishes
 List of beef dishes
 List of stuffed dishes

References

Polish cuisine
Lithuanian cuisine
Belarusian cuisine
Beef dishes
Stuffed dishes